D.C. Minner (January 28, 1935 – May 6, 2008) was an American blues musician, teacher, and philosopher who was known for sharing music with children and adults alike throughout Oklahoma and beyond.

Born in Rentiesville, Oklahoma, he performed with O. V. Wright, Freddie King, Chuck Berry, Eddie Floyd and Bo Diddley, and was inducted into the Oklahoma Jazz Hall of Fame in 1999. He owned the 'Down Home Blues Club' in Rentiesville, where he and his wife Selby Minner held a long-running annual blues festival, the 'Dusk 'til Dawn Blues Festival'. The couple had won an international KBA from the Blues Foundation in Memphis for their BITS (Blues in the Schools) work with children.

History

References

Other sources

1935 births
2008 deaths
People from McIntosh County, Oklahoma
American blues singers
American blues guitarists
American male guitarists
Singers from Oklahoma
African-American history of Oklahoma
20th-century American guitarists
Guitarists from Oklahoma
20th-century American singers
20th-century American male musicians